Kavuri Sambasiva Rao (born 1 October 1943) is an Indian politician, engineer and industrialist from the state of Andhra Pradesh.

He was the Minister of Textiles at Ministry of Textiles, with cabinet rank, for India in UPA Government from 17 June 2013.

Early life and education 
Born in 1943, he was educated at NIT Warangal.

Career
He has been a member of the 8th, 9th, 12th, 14th and 15th Lok Sabha of India. He represents the Eluru constituency of Andhra Pradesh and is a member of the Bhartiya Janata Party, which he joined on 1 May 2014.

Once he was permanent invitee for Congress Working Committee. Earlier he represented Machilipatnam Lok Sabha constituency in Andhra Pradesh. Kavuri is business entrepreneur in the fields of civil construction and health care. He was elected to Indian Parliament for fives times and member in parliament committee. He had sworn in as Union Cabinet minister for Textiles on 17 June 2013.

On 28 April 2014 he resigned from the Congress and announced his decision to join the Bharatiya Janata Party (BJP). A month earlier he had resigned as the minister, protesting the creation of the State of Telangana. He has also announced that he would not contest the Lok Sabha polls on Congress ticket.

References 

1943 births
Living people
Indian National Congress politicians from Andhra Pradesh
India MPs 1984–1989
India MPs 1989–1991
India MPs 1998–1999
India MPs 2004–2009
India MPs 2009–2014
Telugu politicians
Members of the Cabinet of India
Lok Sabha members from Andhra Pradesh
People from West Godavari district
People from Eluru
Engineers from Andhra Pradesh
Indian industrialists
Businesspeople from Andhra Pradesh